Frank Julian Allaun (27 February 1913 – 26 November 2002) was a British Labour politician.

Born in Manchester, Allaun was educated at Manchester Grammar School and worked as an engineer, shop assistant, tour leader, chartered accountant and journalist. He helped to organise the first Aldermaston March in 1958 and was chair of the Labour Peace Fellowship. Allaun was against British membership of the EEC.

Allaun contested Manchester Moss Side in 1951. He was Member of Parliament for Salford East from 1955 to 1983.

He was a veteran of leftwing causes, especially the Campaign for Nuclear Disarmament (CND), of which he was vice president from 1983. He was the first President of the Campaign for Labour Party Democracy in 1973. Allaun wrote several books on nuclear weapons including Stop the H-Bomb Race (1959) and The Wasted 30 Billions (1975).

In his book ‘’Next Stop Execution’’, Oleg Gordievsky stated that’s Allaun’s work with the peace movement and elsewhere was viewed favourably within the Soviet Union.

Outside the peace movement, his preoccupation was with public housing, and he argued vastly increased expenditure should be paid for by cuts in defence. Despite Allaun's life work, Britain remained a nuclear power.

Frank Allaun retired from the House of Commons in 1983 but continued to be active in politics. This included writing the books Spreading the News: A Guide To Media Reform (1989) and The Struggle for Peace (1992).

His recreations were walking and swimming.

His first wife died in 1986, and on 3 June 1989 he married Millie Bobker, née Greenberg, a widow and retired civil servant.

He died in Manchester in 2002 aged 89. His second wife, son and daughter survived him.

Notes

References
Times Guide to the House of Commons, 1966 and 1979

External links 
 

1913 births
2002 deaths
British anti–nuclear weapons activists
British Eurosceptics
Labour Party (UK) MPs for English constituencies
UK MPs 1955–1959
UK MPs 1959–1964
UK MPs 1964–1966
UK MPs 1966–1970
UK MPs 1970–1974
UK MPs 1974
UK MPs 1974–1979
UK MPs 1979–1983
Politicians from Manchester
People educated at Manchester Grammar School
Chairs of the Labour Party (UK)
Jewish British politicians